Cowboys and East Indians: Stories is a 2013 short story collection by Nina McConigley that was the winner of the 2014 PEN literary award.

Plot
Set in India and Wyoming, the stories in Cowboys and East Indians tell the immigrant experience in the American West. From Indian motel owners to a kleptomaniac foreign exchange student, to oil rig workers, to a cross-dressing cowboy, an adopted cowgirl to a medical tourist in India.

References

External links
Goodreads

2013 short story collections
American short story collections
Wyoming in fiction